Allium bisotunense is a species of flowering plant in the family Amaryllidaceae and is endemic to Iran.

They are cultivated in the Iranian Research Institute of Plant Protection.

Etymology 
The name bisotunense derives from Bisotun, a city in Iran.

Description 
Like all species in the Melanocrommyum subgenus, this species is known to have 8 chromosomes. In addition, there is a mix of diploid and triploid individuals.

They have spherical bulbs with a diameter of about 2–3 cm. They have flat, ovate leaves that are 15–25 cm long and bowl-shaped flowers that are 5–6 cm high and 6–10 cm in diameter.

References 

bisotunense
Flora of Iran